The 13th African Championships in Athletics were held in Tunis and Radès, Tunisia in August, 2002.

Men's results

Track

Field

Women results

Track

Field

Medal table

Participating nations

 (50)
 (3)
 (7)
 (10)
 (5)
 (4)
 (8)
 (1)
 (3)
 (1)
 (3)
 (14)
 (1)
 (13)
 (17)
 (4)
 (10)
 (2)
 (11)
 (22)
 (8)
 (15)
 (4)
 (3)
 (2)
 (16)
 (37)
 (1)
 (9)
 (17)
 (1)
 (4)
 (1)
 (22)
 (2)
 (5)
 (15)
 (2)
 (3)
 (53)
 (2)
 (1)

See also
2002 in athletics (track and field)

External links
Medalists - GBR Athletics
Full results

 
A
African Championships in Athletics
A
A
Sports competitions in Tunis
21st century in Tunis
Sports competitions in Radès
21st century in Radès